The 21st annual Hypo-Meeting took place on May 27 and May 28, 1995 in Götzis, Austria. The track and field competition featured a decathlon (men) and a heptathlon (women) event.

Men's Decathlon

Schedule

May 27

May 28

Records

Results

Women's Heptathlon

Schedule

May 27

May 28

Records

Results

Notes

See also
1995 World Championships in Athletics – Men's decathlon
1995 World Championships in Athletics – Women's heptathlon

References
 Statistics
 decathlon2000
 decathlon2000
 decathlonfans
 1995 Year Ranking Decathlon

1995
Hypo-Meeting
Hypo-Meeting